The Royal Montreal Hockey Club, also known as the Montreal Royals, was a Canadian amateur ice hockey club formed in Montreal, Quebec, in 1932. It operated various teams in men's junior and senior leagues until 1961. The senior team of the club won the Allan Cup men's championship in 1939 and 1947, and the junior team of 1949 won the Memorial Cup junior men's Canadian championship.

History
The hockey club was founded in 1932, operated by E. S. Hamilton and G. T. Ogilvie. Formed from the Montreal Hockey Club, the senior Royals played in the Quebec Amateur Hockey Association play from 1932–1933, in the Quebec Senior Hockey League from 1944–1953, the Quebec Hockey League from 1953–1959, and the Eastern Professional Hockey League from 1959–1961. The senior Royals won the QSHL championship in 1945 and 1946, and the QHL championship in 1959. The senior Royals won the Allan Cup in 1947.

The junior Royals played in the Quebec Junior Hockey League. The Junior team reached the eastern Canadian championship five times, winning in 1941 and 1949, and finished runners-up in 1933, 1944 and 1945. The junior Royals won the Memorial Cup in 1949, and were finalists in 1941.

When the Royals advanced to the 1941 Memorial Cup semifinals, Quebec Amateur Hockey Association president Norman Dawe lobbied for games to be played at the Montreal Forum instead of all games in Toronto. The Canadian Amateur Hockey Association voted against his request due to budget constraints and travel costs. In the 1941 Memorial Cup final, the Montreal Royals won both games played on home ice, but failed to win the cup when they lost all three games played in Toronto. In the 1942 Memorial Cup playoffs, the Montreal Royals defeated the Halifax Junior Canadians by a 12–3 score in the first game of a best-of-three series at Montreal Forum. The remainder of series was cancelled due to poor attendance and gate receipts.

Championships

 1939, 1947 – Allan Cup champions
 1945, 1946, 1947 – Quebec Senior Hockey League
 1949 – Memorial Cup champions
 1959 – Quebec Hockey League

Season-by-season results
Season-by-season results for the Montreal Royals senior hockey team.
 1932–1941: Montreal Senior Group, (QAHA)
 1941–1953: Quebec Senior Hockey League (QSHL)
  1953–1959  : Quebec Hockey League (QHL)
  1959–1961  : Eastern Professional Hockey League (EPHL)

† Team played some four-point games against McGill
Source: 1935–38: Ottawa Citizen, 1942–43: Ottawa Citizen, 1943–44: Ottawa Citizen

References

Ice hockey teams in Montreal
Defunct ice hockey teams in Canada
Ice hockey clubs established in 1932
1932 establishments in Quebec